Johannes Andreas "Joop" Stokkermans (20 February 1937 in Leiden – 25 October 2012 in Hilversum) was a Dutch composer and pianist.

Biography
Stokkermans studied piano and composition with Theo van der Pas at the Royal Conservatory of The Hague.

He received a Golden Harp award in 1974 for his entire œuvre.

Selected works
Piano
 Hommage, 13 Pieces (1982)
 La plage et ses variations (1992)
 Oranje rhapsodie for carillon or piano

Songs
 "Katinka" (1962)
 "Morgen" (Someday) (1968)
 "Tijd" (1971)

Musicals
 De Engel van Amsterdam (1975)
 Nijntje (2001); based on the picture book Miffy
 Kunt u mij de weg naar Hamelen vertellen, mijnheer? (2003)

Music for television
 Paulus de boskabouter (Paulus the Woodgnome)
 Barbapapa
 De Bereboot (The Bear Boat)
 Kunt u mij de weg naar Hamelen vertellen, mijnheer? (Hamelen)
 De Kris Pusaka
 De Brekers

Film scores
 Pinkeltje (1978)
 For a Lost Soldier (1992)

See also
 Nationaal Songfestival

References

External links

1937 births
2012 deaths
20th-century classical composers
20th-century classical pianists
20th-century Dutch male musicians
21st-century classical composers
21st-century classical pianists
21st-century male musicians
Composers for carillon
Dutch classical composers
Dutch classical pianists
Dutch film score composers
Dutch male classical composers
Dutch musical theatre composers
Male classical pianists
Male film score composers
Male musical theatre composers
Male television composers
People from Leiden
Royal Conservatory of The Hague alumni
Television composers